Eugene Willford "Gene" Markey (December 11, 1895 – May 1, 1980) was an American writer, producer, screenwriter, and highly decorated naval officer.

Biography

Early life
Markey was born in Michigan in 1895. His father, Eugene Lawrence Markey, was a colonel in the United States Army. His uncle, Daniel P. Markey, had been Speaker of the Michigan House of Representatives. He graduated from Dartmouth College in 1918.

Chicago
He was a skilled sketch artist, which gained him entry, after World War I, into the Art Institute of Chicago starting in 1919 and finishing in 1920. There, he claimed to have "studied painting and learned nothing". After that, he worked as a journalist in Chicago for several newspapers and magazines, including Photoplay magazine. It was during the 1920s that Gene Markey became a writer, specializing in novels about the Jazz Age. Among his titles were Anabel; Stepping High; Women, Women, Everywhere; and His Majesty's Pyjamas. His book Literary Lights (March 1923, Alfred A. Knopf, New York) was a collection of fifty caricatures of important literary authors of the day.

Hollywood
He went to Hollywood in 1929 and became a screenwriter for Twentieth Century Fox. His screen credits included King of Burlesque (1936) starring Alice Faye, Girls' Dormitory (1936) featuring Herbert Marshall, and On the Avenue (1937), starring Dick Powell, Madeleine Carroll, and Alice Faye. He was also the producer of the 1937 Shirley Temple film, Wee Willie Winkie, among others.

Although he was not overly handsome, he was a very skilled conversationalist and he quickly became a popular fixture in Hollywood society. Among his good friends in Hollywood were producer John Hay Whitney, composer Irving Berlin, and actors Douglas Fairbanks Jr., Ward Bond and John Wayne.  He would often go fishing with Bond and Wayne off Catalina Island.  A 1946 article in the Washington Times Herald said, "Other Men Say: What's Gene Markey Got That We Haven't Got?" The article ran a photo of Rudolph Valentino with the caption, "NOT SO HOT – By Comparison. Though all American womanhood swooned over him in his day, Rudolph Valentino was no Markey." Soon after he arrived in Hollywood in 1929, it was also reported that, "Markey became the most sought after unattached man in the cinema firmament, so sprinkled with far handsomer, richer male stars." Markey was married three times to prominent film actresses.  His first marriage, to Joan Bennett, from 1932 to 1937, produced a daughter, Melinda, in 1934. He was married to Hedy Lamarr from 1939 to 1940 and to Myrna Loy from 1946 to 1950. At first, Loy claimed mental cruelty, but later retracted it, saying, "He could make a scrubwoman think she was a queen and he could make a queen think she was the queen of queens."

Military career
After his graduation from Dartmouth, Markey became a lieutenant in the infantry during World War I (which the United States had entered in 1917) and saw action at the Battle of Belleau Wood.  He then joined the U.S. Naval Reserve in 1920, and it was during World War II that he made his greatest mark. In August 1941, he reported to Balboa, Panama, with the rank of lieutenant commander. He had a yacht, Melinda (named after his daughter), that he donated to the United States Navy for use as a submarine chaser. During the war, Markey rose to the rank of commodore and served as an assistant intelligence officer on the staff of Fleet Admiral William "Bull" Halsey at Guadalcanal. After the war, he was promoted to rear admiral and he officially retired from the Navy on February 27, 1956.  He was highly decorated; among his awards were the Legion of Merit, Bronze Star with Combat V (for leading a reconnaissance mission in the Solomon Islands in 1942), a Navy Commendation Medal, Italy's Star of Solidarity, and France's Legion of Honor.  During World War II, Markey became good friends with Louis Mountbatten, 1st Earl Mountbatten of Burma.  After the war, he became a special assistant to United States Secretary of the Navy James Forrestal.  Markey was very proud of his admiral's commission.  He insisted on being called "Admiral Markey", never "Mister Markey" and, rarely, "Gene".  For the rest of his life, he would promptly toss any mail (including bills) that wasn't addressed to Admiral Markey into the trash.

Later life
He returned to Hollywood after the war and, on September 27, 1952, he married his fourth wife, Lucille Parker Wright, the widow of Warren Wright, owner of the Calumet Farm racing stable. Markey left California after this marriage.

He developed something of a knack for naming the farm's horses. First there was a filly, named Our Mims after his daughter Melinda. Another was named Myrtle Morgan after the two streets that intersected in front of his property in Saratoga Springs, New York. Still another was Eastern Fleet (possibly named as a tribute to his service in the Navy), which would finish fourth in the 1971 Kentucky Derby and second in the Preakness Stakes. Markey was also a lover of dogs; he owned a black Labrador Retriever named Lucky that lived to the very unusual old age of 17.  Mrs. Markey also had a dog, a Yorkshire Terrier named Timmy Tammy (after which she was thought to have named one of Calumet Farm's champion thoroughbreds, Tim Tam). Mrs. Markey carried the dog with her in her purse everywhere she went.

Shortly after this marriage, Markey would become good friends with Ralph Wilson, who later was the founder and owner of the Buffalo Bills of the National Football League.   One of Mrs. Markey's hobbies was collecting statues of eagles. In 18th century Kentucky, eagles were widely believed to be a symbol of good luck.

Dividing his time between Lexington, Kentucky, Saratoga Springs, New York, and Miami Beach, Florida (with an occasional trip to Europe thrown in), he continued to write. Among his works during this period were: Kentucky Pride, an adventure–romance set in Civil War Kentucky, and That Far Paradise, a story of an 18th-century family making its way from Virginia to settle in what later became Kentucky. As background research for his book, Markey recreated the journey himself. Markey was very fond of the time he spent in Kentucky, quickly becoming a fixture on its social scene and becoming good friends with many members of the thoroughbred racing community. He once told a reporter, "I cannot restrain my ardor for the place and its people...No duck ever took to water as I have taken to Kentucky."

Markey was also a noted party giver.  One of his specialties was a tropical punch made with an unknown number of rums.  At his parties, his old friends from Hollywood often mixed with his new friends from Kentucky and mixed very well.  While he lived in Kentucky, he purchased an old 18th-century log cabin and had it moved to the Calumet Farm property, where he would use it as his writing room. He also had two brands of private reserve bourbon distilled that he named "Old Commodore" (as a tribute to his service in the U.S. Navy) and "Old Calumet Cabin" (after his writing room).

On July 31, 1958, Admiral Markey was commissioned a Kentucky Colonel (a ceremonial rank) by Governor Albert Benjamin "Happy" Chandler Sr. He also served as the model for the character played by Burgess Meredith in the 1965 film In Harm's Way, starring his good friend John Wayne.

Admiral and Mrs. Markey remained married until his death in 1980, He was buried in the Lexington Cemetery in Lexington, Kentucky. His widow Lucille was buried next to him upon her death in 1982.

Selected filmography
 Lucky in Love (1929)
 Mother's Boy (1929)
 West of Broadway (1931)
 Luxury Liner (1933)
 Let's Live Tonight (1935)
 Private Number (1936)
 The Big Noise (1936)
 Josette (1938)

References

Sources
 Wild Ride, Anne Hagedorn Auerbach, New York, Henry Holt and Company, LLC, 1994
 The Bennetts: An Acting Family, Brian Kellow, Lexington, The University Press of Kentucky, 2004

External links
 
 

1895 births
1980 deaths
American film producers
American male screenwriters
Recipients of the Legion of Merit
United States Navy officers
20th-century American male writers
20th-century American screenwriters
United States Navy personnel of World War I
United States Navy personnel of World War II